George Ranken (4 January 1828 – 28 February 1856) was a British soldier and author. A major in the Royal Engineers, he was known for his service in the Crimean War and travel writing.

References

1828 births
1856 deaths
Royal Engineers officers
British travel writers
Place of birth missing
Place of death missing
British Army personnel of the American Revolutionary War
Accidental deaths in Ukraine